NationLink Telecom is a telecommunications firm based in Somalia.

Overview
NationLink Telecom was founded in September 1997 by Abdirizak Ido, a Somali businessman currently serving as the company's President and controlling shareholder. The firm is one of the leading telecommunications service providers (TSP) in Somalia and offers its services throughout the country.

Services
The company's focus is in the core areas of mobile-phone, internet and fixed-line services. Its overall objective is to supply telecommunication services to all Somalis, and in the process, help improve standards of living. Nationlink is among the biggest mobile network operators in the country.

See also
Golis Telecom Somalia
Hormuud Telecom
Telcom
Somali Telecom Group
Netco (Somalia)
Somafone
Somtel
Telesom

References

interWAVE, July 1, 2003 – interWAVE to Deliver Additional High Capacity GSM Switches to Nationlink Telecom in Somalia
Mobile Africa – Nationlink Telecom in Somalia

External links
NationLink Telecom official site
Bintel official site
Article on President

Telecommunications companies established in 1997
Telecommunications companies of Somalia
1997 establishments in Somalia